Cenovus Energy Inc. (pronounced se-nō-vus) is a Canadian integrated oil and natural gas company headquartered in Calgary, Alberta.

Cenovus was formed in 2009 when Encana Corporation split into two distinct companies, with Cenovus becoming focused on oil sands assets.

In 2017, Cenovus purchased ConocoPhillips' 50 percent share of their Foster Creek Christina Lake (FCCL) oil sands projects and most of their conventional assets in Alberta and British Columbia, including the Deep Basin. Cenovus completed the acquisition of Husky Energy for C$3.9 billion in stock in January 2021. The combined company is Canada’s third-largest crude oil and natural gas producer and the second-largest Canadian-based refiner and upgrader.

Cenovus is headquartered in Calgary's Brookfield Place, having completed a move from the neighbouring Bow in 2019.

Operations

Oil sands
Cenovus has four producing projects in the oil sands – Foster Creek, Christina Lake (Alberta), Sunrise (jointly owned with BP Canada and operated by Cenovus) and Tucker. All projects use a drilling method called steam-assisted gravity drainage (SAGD). On May 17, 2017, Foster Creek and Christina Lake became 100 percent owned and operated by Cenovus. In December 2021, Cenovus announced the sale of the Tucker oil sands project to Strathcona Resources. In June 2022, Cenovus announced it would acquire the outstanding 50% interest in the Sunrise oil sands asset and assume full ownership.

Conventional oil and gas
Cenovus once held conventional oil and natural gas operations across Alberta and Saskatchewan, including the Weyburn oilfield in Saskatchewan, which is the largest  enhanced oil recovery operation in Canada. It's also the site of the largest geological greenhouse gas storage project in the world, with about 30 million tonnes of  safely stored underground and extensively studied by researchers as part of the International Energy Agency Greenhouse Gas Weyburn-Midale  Monitoring and Storage Project.

In May 2017, Cenovus assumed ownership of ConocoPhillips' conventional assets in Alberta and British Columbia. Cenovus’s current conventional assets include the Deep Basin, a liquids-rich natural gas fairway located in northwestern Alberta and northeastern British Columbia, and the Marten Hills heavy oil project. The Deep Basin asset comprises approximately 2.8 million net acres of land and produced more than 97,000 barrels of oil equivalent a day in 2019. Cenovus also holds a significant land position in the Marten Hills region for potential development. In November 2020, Cenovus announced the sale of the Marten Hills assets to Headwater Exploration Inc.

Refining
Following the acquisition of Husky Energy in January 2021, Cenovus became Canada’s second-largest Canadian-based refiner and upgrader. Cenovus owns the Lima Refinery in Lima, Ohio, the Superior Refinery in Superior, Wisconsin and the Lloydminster refinery and upgrader in Lloydminster, Alberta. Cenovus has 50 percent ownership in two refineries in the United States: the Wood River Refinery (Illinois) and Borger, Texas refinery. Phillips 66 is the co-owner and operator. In August 2022, Cenovus reached an agreement to purchase bp’s 50% interest in the bp-Husky Toledo Refinery in Ohio. Cenovus has owned the other 50% of the refinery since its combination with Husky Energy in 2021.

Transportation
Cenovus owns a crude-by-rail loading facility near Edmonton, Alberta – the Bruderheim Energy Terminal. The company was recognized for its rail safety performance in 2016, and for safe transportation of chemical products in 2017.

Technology 
The primary technology Cenovus uses at its Foster Creek and Christina Lake projects is called steam-assisted gravity drainage (SAGD). Cenovus also applies different associated technologies to enhance the SAGD process, such as electric submersible pumps at Foster Creek and solvent aided process (SAP) at Christina Lake.

In 2011, the company began applying its blowdown boiler technology to improve the efficiency of water use at its oil sands operations. In 2013, Cenovus developed its SkyStrat™ drilling rig that allows an exploratory rig to be flown into remote areas by helicopter piece-by-piece, set up to drill a test well, dismantled and airlifted away. The process requires no roads, meaning little disturbance to the boreal forest. The company received an Environmental Performance award for the SkyStrat™ program.

Potential mitigation of climate impacts 
Cenovus is a member of Oil Sands Pathways to Net Zero initiative, an alliance of oil sands companies working collectively with the federal and Alberta governments to achieve net zero greenhouse gas (GHG) emissions from the companies oil sands operations by 2050.  According to Cenovus's Chief Sustainability Officer, the company is pursuing government support for decarbonization efforts, because "[t]hese are not projects that make revenue.  So for a corporation that is owned by shareholders to put 100 per cent of the costs into a project that doesn’t bring any revenue back, that is not something that a corporation can do."  However, a report by the Canadian Institute for Climate Choices, a source of independent analysis on climate change issues funded by Environment Canada, recommended investing limited public dollars to capture "a share of growing, transition-opportunity markets" rather than in "assets at elevated risk of being stranded in global low-carbon scenarios" as fossil fuel demand "inevitably decline[s] globally".

Leadership

Chairman of the Board 
Michael A. Grandin, 2009–2017
Patrick D. Daniel, 2017–2020
Keith A. MacPhail, 2020–2023
Alexander J. Pourbaix, 2023–

President 
Brian C. Ferguson, 2009–2017
Alexander J. Pourbaix, 2017–2023
Jonathan M. McKenzie, 2023–

See also

Axe Lake Aerodrome
Husky Energy

References

External links 

Oil companies of Canada
Natural gas companies of Canada
Companies based in Calgary
Canadian companies established in 2009
Energy companies established in 2009
Non-renewable resource companies established in 2009
Companies listed on the New York Stock Exchange
Companies listed on the Toronto Stock Exchange
S&P/TSX 60
Corporate spin-offs
2009 establishments in Alberta